Farming is an unincorporated community in Farming Township, Stearns County, Minnesota, United States.  The community is located near the junction of Stearns County Roads 23, 41, and 42.  Nearby places include Albany, Richmond, and St. Martin.

References

Unincorporated communities in Stearns County, Minnesota
Unincorporated communities in Minnesota